Epicrocis africanella is a species of snout moth in the genus Epicrocis. It was described by Ragonot in 1888. It is found in South Africa.

References

Moths described in 1888
Phycitini
Endemic moths of South Africa